İzmir Adnan Menderes Airport  is an international airport serving İzmir and most of the surrounding province in Turkey. It is named after former Turkish prime minister Adnan Menderes.

Overview
The new international terminal, which was designed by Yakup Hazan Architecture, opened in September 2006, with the new domestic terminal opening around March 2014. It replaced Çiğli Air Base which is now used only as a military base.

In 2017, ADB served 12.8 million passengers, 10.5 million of which were domestic passengers. It has ranked 5th in terms of total passenger traffic (after Istanbul Airport, Antalya Airport, Sabiha Gökçen Airport and Esenboğa Airport), and 4th in terms of domestic passenger traffic (after Atatürk Airport, Sabiha Gökçen Airport and Esenboğa Airport) within the country.

ADB has two runways, 16R/34L and 16L/34R; however, the two runways cannot operate simultaneously due to both their proximity and the lack of a dedicated taxiway to runway 16R/34L in the past. This has led to the use of runway 16L/34R as the primary runway, while runway 16R/34L is used mostly as a parallel taxiway, although it is available for use as a backup if the main runway is undergoing maintenance or is unavailable for whatever reason. In efforts to expand the airport's facilities, existing entrance taxiways were refurbished, along with the construction of a parallel taxiway, entrance taxiways, and aprons for passenger and cargo aircraft, as well as for de-icing. Completed in March 2020, the new  apron area increased the remote parking capacity of the airport from 35 to 61 with a total of 26 new spaces – eight of which are designated for use by private aircraft. In 2020, Adnan Menderes Airport was named one of the best European airports with a capacity of 5 – 15 million passengers by Airports Council International.

Airlines and destinations

Passenger
The following airlines operate regular scheduled and charter flights at İzmir Adnan Menderes Airport:

Cargo

Traffic statistics

Ground transport

Road
The airport can be reached from Izmir via the 200, 202 or 204 ESHOT buses or by Havaş airport shuttle buses (every 20 minutes, 35 to 60 minutes) from the Turkish Airlines office.

Rail
Izban commuter rail trains stop at the Airport Station about every 10 mins at peak hours and 20 mins off peak. Intercity trains operated by the Turkish State Railways also stop at the Airport Station. There are currently about 14 daily trains in both directions. Northbound trains all go to Basmane Terminal in the city center, while southbound trains serve Ödemiş, Tire, Söke, Aydın, Nazilli Torbalı and stations in between.

See also
 List of the busiest airports in Turkey

References

External links

Official website

Airports in Turkey
Buildings and structures in İzmir Province
Transport in İzmir
Adnan Menderes
Transport in İzmir Province
Airports established in 1987
1987 establishments in Turkey